Eusthenomus hopei is a species of beetle in the family Cerambycidae. It was described by Lane in 1970.

References

Anisocerini
Beetles described in 1970